André Drouin ( – 2 April 2017) was a Canadian politician, who served as a city councillor in Hérouxville, Quebec. He is best known as the author of the controversial Hérouxville Standards, a document which sparked national debate in 2007 over the principle of providing reasonable accommodation for cultural and religious diversity.

Election
Drouin was elected as the council member for Hérouxville's Electoral District No. 6 in 2005.

Code of conduct

Drouin was largely unknown beyond the Mauricie region of the province of Quebec until, in January 2007, he authored a 'code of conduct' that spells out standards for newcomers to his community. The controversial document drew media attention because of its perceived eccentricity and alleged lack of inclusiveness toward certain minorities. It contradicts a number of Supreme Court rulings and notably forbids residents to:

 Kill women by stoning them in public
 Burn women alive or with acid
 Carry kirpans in public

Despite its flaws, Drouin's code raised questions on the limits of tolerance and fueled the debate over reasonable accommodations.

Tout le monde en parle
In February 2007, Drouin went on the set of the French Canadian talk-show Tout le monde en parle to expose his views. While on the show, he claimed that he had no intention to succeed Hérouxville Mayor Martin Périgny. Host Guy A. Lepage and panelist Dany Turcotte expressed serious reservations about whether the code was the appropriate solution to immigration concerns.

Death
Drouin died on 2 April 2017 from cancer, aged 70.

References

External links
  Town of Hérouxville Official Web Site

1940s births
Year of birth missing
2017 deaths
Quebec municipal councillors
Deaths from cancer in Quebec